Xia is the Mandarin pinyin romanization of the Chinese surname written  in Chinese character. It is romanized Hsia in Wade–Giles, and Ha in Cantonese. Xia is the 154th surname in the Song dynasty classic text Hundred Family Surnames. As of 2008, it is the 66th most common Chinese surname, shared by 3.7 million people.

Notable people
 Xia Zhengshu (夏征舒; died 598 BC), Minister of the State of Chen who killed Duke Ling of Chen and usurped the throne
 Consort Xia (夏姬; died 240 BC), mother of King Zhuangxiang of Qin and grandmother of Qin Shi Huang
 Empress Dowager Xia (6th century), mother of Emperor Jing of Liang
 Xia Luqi (882–930), Later Tang general
 Xia Song (夏竦; 985–1051), Song dynasty general, Duke of Ying
 Empress Xia (Song dynasty) (died 1167), wife of Emperor Xiaozong of Song
 Xia Gui (fl. 1195–1224), Song dynasty painter
 Xia Yuanji (1366–1430), Ming dynasty government minister
 Xia Chang (1388–1470). Ming dynasty painter and official
 Xia Yan (1482–1548), Ming dynasty government minister
 Empress Xia (1492–1535), Ming dynasty empress, wife of the Zhengde Emperor
 Xia Yunyi (1596–1645), Ming dynasty poet and anti-Qing military leader
 Xia Wanchun (夏完淳; 1631–1647), poet, soldier, and son of Xia Yunyi, executed by the Qing at age 16
 Xia Xie (夏燮; 1800–1875), Qing dynasty historian, author of Ming Tongjian (明通鑑)
 Xia Suntong (夏孙桐; 1857–1941), historian, co-author of Draft History of Qing
 Xia Zengyou (夏曾佑; 1863–1924), historian and educator
 Xia Tonghe (夏同龢; 1868–1925), Qing dynasty zhuangyuan and calligrapher
 Xia Shoutian (夏壽田; 1870–1935), Qing dynasty and Republic of China artist and politician
 Xia Ruifang (夏瑞芳; 1871–1914), co-founder of the Commercial Press, assassinated by Chen Qimei
 Xia Gong (1872–1941), Republic of China politician
 Xia Kaifu (夏偕復; 1874–?), Republic of China ambassador to the United States
 Xia Renhu (夏仁虎; 1874–1963), Republic of China politician and scholar
 Xia Jingguan (夏敬观; 1875–1953), poet, President of Fudan Public School (now Fudan University)
 Xia Chao (1882–1926), Republic of China general, Governor of Zhejiang province
 Xia Douyin (1885–1951), Republic of China general, Governor of Hubei province
 Xia Mianzun (夏丏尊; 1886–1946), educator and writer
 Xia Qifeng (1888–1961), politician of the Wang Jingwei regime
 Xia Suchu (1889–?), politician of the Wang Jingwei regime
 Xia Qin (1892–1950), President of the Supreme Court of the Republic of China
 Xia Wei (夏威; 1893–1975), Republic of China general, Governor of Anhui province
 Xia Guozhang (夏國樟; 1896–1937), lieutenant general and brother of Xia Wei, killed in the Second Sino-Japanese War
 Xia Minghan (1900–1928), Communist revolutionary
 Xia Yan (1900–1995), playwright, Deputy Minister of Culture
 Xia Xi (1901–1936), early leader of the Communist Party of China
 Xia Jinxiong (夏晉熊; born 1902), acting Minister of Finance of the Republic of China
 Xia Jianbai (夏坚白; 1903–1977), academician of the Chinese Academy of Sciences, President of Tongji University
 Xia Chuzhong (1904–1988), Republic of China general
 Xia Zhengnong (夏征农; 1904–2008), writer and politician
 Xia Nai (1910–1985), pioneering archaeologist
 Xia Xiaohua (夏曉華; 1919–2003), founder of the Taiwan Daily and Chengsheng Broadcasting
 Xia Gongquan (夏功权; 1919–2008), Republic of China diplomat
 C. T. Hsia (1921–2013), literary critic and scholar
 Xia Peisu (1923–2014), female computer scientist, academician of the Chinese Academy of Sciences
 Xia Suisheng (1924–2019), surgeon and pioneer in organ transplantation
 Xia Meng (1933–2016), Hong Kong actress and film producer
 Timothy Ha (born 1937), Hong Kong educator
 Ronald Arculli or Xia Jiali (born 1939), former chairman of Hong Kong Exchanges and Clearing
 Xia Taifeng (夏台鳳; born 1949), Taiwanese actress and singer
 Andrew Hsia or Xia Liyan (born 1950), Minister of Mainland Affairs Council of the Republic of China (2015-2016)
 Xia Baolong (born 1952), Communist Party Chief and former Governor of Zhejiang
 Xia Gang (born 1953), film director, winner of Golden Rooster Award for Best Director
 Xia Lingling (夏玲玲; born 1953), Taiwanese actress
 Xia Deren (born 1955), Deputy Communist Party Chief of Liaoning province
 Yuen Biao or Xia Lingzhen (born 1957), Hong Kong actor
 Xia Yeliang (born 1960), former Peking University economist and dissident
 Zhihong Xia (born 1962), Chinese-American mathematician
 Xia Jiaping (born 1969), tennis player
 Ha Hee-ra or Xia Xiluo (born 1969), South Korean actress of Chinese descent
 Tony Xia (born 1976), businessman; owner of Aston Villa F.C.
 Lulu Hsia Chia-lu (夏嘉璐; born 1977), Taiwanese TV Host
 Xia Yu (born 1978), actor
 Xia Xuanze (born 1979), badminton player, world champion
 Xia Da (born 1981), cartoonist
 Xia Ningning (born 1987), football player
 Xia Lina (born 1987), Olympic alpine ski racer
 Xia Kangnan (born 1988), baseball player
 Xia Huan (born 1992), badminton player
 Xia Hanyu (夏瀚宇) (born 1997), singer and dancer. Member of UNINE
 Xia Zhiguang (夏之光) (born 2000), singer and dancer. Member of X-NINE and R1SE

References

Chinese-language surnames
Individual Chinese surnames